Southern Airways Flight 932 was a chartered Southern Airways Douglas DC-9 domestic United States commercial jet flight from Stallings Field (ISO) in Kinston, North Carolina, to Huntington Tri-State Airport/Milton J. Ferguson Field (HTS) near Kenova and Ceredo, West Virginia. At 7:36 pm on November 14, 1970, the aircraft crashed into a hill just short of the Tri-State Airport, killing all 75 people on board in what has been recognized as "the worst sports-related air tragedy in U.S. history".

The plane was carrying 37 members of the Marshall University Thundering Herd football team, eight members of the coaching staff, 25 boosters, two pilots, two flight attendants, and a charter coordinator. The team was returning home after a 17–14 loss to the East Carolina Pirates at Ficklen Stadium in Greenville, North Carolina.

At the time, Marshall's athletic teams rarely traveled by plane, since most away games were within easy driving distance of the campus. The team originally planned to cancel the flight, but changed plans and chartered the Southern Airways DC-9. The accident is the deadliest tragedy to have affected any sports team in U.S. history.

It was the second college football team plane crash in a little over a month, after the October 2 crash that killed 31 (head coach, 14 Wichita State players, and 16 others).

Aircraft and crew
The aircraft was a 95-seat, twin-jet engine Douglas DC-9-30 with tail registration N97S. The airliner's crew was Captain Frank Abbot (47), First Officer Jerry Smith (28), plus two flight attendants. All were qualified for the flight. This flight was the only flight that year for the Marshall University football team.

Events leading to the crash
The original proposal to charter the flight was refused because it would exceed "the takeoff limitations of their aircraft". The subsequent negotiations resulted in a reduction of the weight of passengers and baggage... and the charter flight was scheduled." The airliner left Stallings Field at Kinston, North Carolina, and the flight proceeded to Huntington without incident. The controllers advised the crew that "rain, fog, smoke and a ragged ceiling" were at the airport, making landing more difficult, but possible. At 7:34 pm, the airliner's crew reported passing Tri-State Airport's outer marker. The controller gave them clearance to land. Instead, the descent continued for another  for unknown reasons, apparently without either crew member actually seeing the airport lights or runway. In the transcript of their cockpit communications in the final minutes, the pilots briefly debated that their autopilot had "captured" for a glide slope descent, although the airport was only equipped with a localizer. The report also noted that the craft approached the Catlettsburg Refinery in the final 30 seconds before impact, which "could have...affected...a visual illusion produced by the difference in the elevation of the refinery and the airport," which was nearly  higher than the refinery, with hills in between. The co-pilot, monitoring the altimeter, called out, "It's beginning to lighten up a little bit on the ground here at... seven hundred feet... We're two hundred above [the descent vector]," and the charter coordinator replied, "Bet it'll be a missed approach." The corresponding flight recorder shows that the craft descended another  in elevation within these 12 seconds, and the co-pilot calls out "four hundred" and agrees with the pilot they are on the correct "approach." In the next second, though, the co-pilot quickly calls out new readings, "hundred and twenty-six ... hundred", and the sounds of impact immediately follow.

Crash
According to the official National Transportation Safety Board (NTSB) report, the accident was "unsurvivable". The aircraft "dipped to the right, almost inverted, and had crashed into a hollow 'nose-first'". Although the airport runway has since been lengthened past its original threshold, making historical measurements more difficult, the NTSB official report provides, "the accident occurred during hours of darkness at 38° 22' 27" N. latitude and 82° 34' 42" W. longitude." The report additionally notes, "Most of the fuselage was melted or reduced to a powder-like substance; however, several large pieces were scattered throughout the burned area." The remains of six passengers were never identified.

Investigation
The NTSB investigated the accident and its final report was issued on April 14, 1972. In the report, the NTSB concluded, "[...] the probable cause of this accident was the descent below Minimum Descent Altitude during a nonprecision approach under adverse operating conditions, without visual contact with the runway environment". They further stated, "The Board has been unable to determine the reason for this [greater] descent, although the two most likely explanations are (a) improper use of cockpit instrumentation data, or (b) an altimetry system error." At least one source says that water that had seeped into the plane's altimeter could have thrown off its height readings, leading the pilots to believe the plane was higher than was actually the case.

The board made three recommendations as a result of this accident, including recommendations for heads-up displays, ground proximity warning devices, and surveillance and inspection of flight operations.

Subsequent events at Marshall
On November 15, 1970, a memorial service was held at the indoor, 8,500-seat Veterans Memorial Fieldhouse with moments of silence, remembrances, and prayers. The following Saturday, another memorial service was held at the outdoor, 18,000-seat Fairfield Stadium. Across the nation, many expressed their condolences. Classes at Marshall, along with numerous events and shows by the Marshall Artists Series (and the football team's game against the Ohio Bobcats), were cancelled and government offices were closed. A mass funeral was held at the field house and many of the dead were buried at the Spring Hill Cemetery, some together because bodies were not identifiable.

The effects of the crash on Huntington went far beyond the Marshall campus. Because it was the Herd's only charter flight of the season, boosters and prominent citizens were on the plane, including a city councilman, a state legislator, and four physicians. Seventy children had at least one parent die in the crash, with 18 of them left orphaned.

The crash of Flight 932 so devastated the local community that it almost led to the discontinuation of Marshall's football program. New coach Jack Lengyel, Marshall University students, and Thundering Herd football fans convinced acting Marshall president, Donald N. Dedmon, to reconsider cancelling the program in late 1970.  In the following weeks, Lengyel was aided in his attempts by receivers' coach Red Dawson. Dawson was a coach from the previous staff who had driven back from the East Carolina game along with Gail Parker, a freshman coach. Parker flew to the game, but did not fly back, having switched places with Deke Brackett, another coach.  Dawson and Parker were buying boiled peanuts at a country store in rural Virginia when they heard the news over the radio. Before the trip, they were scheduled to go on a recruiting mission to Ferrum College after the ECU–Marshall game, in an ultimately unsuccessful effort to recruit junior college linebacker Billy Joe Mantooth. After the crash, Red Dawson helped bring together a group of players who were on the junior varsity football team during the 1970 season, as well as students and athletes from other sports, to form a 1971 football team. 

The NCAA granted Marshall permission to use freshmen on the varsity squad, something which was not allowed at the time. The NCAA repealed that prohibition at its annual convention in January 1972. Following its plane crash, Wichita State was granted similar permission to use freshmen on the varsity to resume its 1970 season. 

Head coach Rick Tolley was among the crash victims. Lengyel was named to take Tolley's place on March 12, 1971, after Dick Bestwick, the first choice for the job, backed out after just one week and returned to Georgia Tech. Lengyel, who came from a coaching job at the College of Wooster, was hired by the recently hired athletic director Joe McMullen, under whom he had previously worked at the University of Akron in the 1950s.

The Marshall University football team only won two games during the 1971 season, against Xavier and Bowling Green. Lengyel led the Thundering Herd to a 9–33 record during his tenure, which ended after the 1974 season.

Memorials

Marshall University President John G. Barker and Vice President Dedmon appointed a memorial committee soon after the crash. The committee decided upon one major memorial within the campus, a plaque and memorial garden at Fairfield Stadium, and a granite cenotaph at the Spring Hill Cemetery; the Memorial Student Center was designated a memorial as well.

On November 12, 1972, the Memorial Fountain was dedicated at the entrance of the Memorial Student Center. The sculpture's designer, Harry Bertoia, created the $25,000 memorial that incorporated bronze, copper tubing, and welding rods. The 6500 lb, 13 ft-high (2900 kg, 4 m-high) sculpture was completed within a year and a half. A plaque was placed on the base on August 10, 1973, reading:

Every year, on the anniversary of the crash, the fountain is shut off during a commemorative ceremony and not activated again until the following spring.

Each year on the anniversary of the crash, those who died are mourned in a ceremony on the Marshall University campus in Huntington, West Virginia. A number of the victims are buried in a grave site in the Spring Hill Cemetery in Huntington; 20th Street between Joan C. Edwards Stadium, Marshall's current on-campus football stadium, and Spring Hill Cemetery was renamed Marshall Memorial Boulevard in honor of the crash victims.

On November 11, 2000, the We Are Marshall Memorial Bronze was dedicated. The bronze 17×23 ft (5×7 m) statue was created by artist Burl Jones of Sissonville, West Virginia, and cost $150,000. It is based upon ideas by John and Ann Krieger of Huntington. It was donated to the university by Marshall fans and is attached to Joan C. Edwards Stadium on the west façade. It was unveiled to thousands 90 minutes before the game with the Miami University RedHawks.

On December 11, 2006, a memorial plaque was dedicated at the plane crash site. The ceremony featured guest speakers Dawson and Hardin. The Ceredo and Kenova fire departments were recognized at the event.

The memorial plaque reads:

Another plaque memorializing the 1970 Marshall football team was unveiled at East Carolina University on the same day and can be seen at the guest team entrance of Dowdy–Ficklen Stadium. Featured speakers were Chancellor Steve Ballard, Athletic Director Terry Holland, Pirates' broadcaster Jeff Charles, and Marshall president, Stephen Kopp.

A memorial bell tower is being planned for a location on WV 75 near exit 1 along Interstate 64.

November 14, 2013, marked the first time that Marshall had played a road game on an anniversary of the disaster.  As a memorial to the 75 victims, the Marshall players wore the number 75 on their helmets. The tribute was repeated for the rest of the season, including when Marshall met Rice in the 2013 Conference USA Football Championship game.

Marshall was scheduled to commemorate the 50th anniversary of the air disaster in their football season opener on August 29, 2020. The opponent was scheduled to be East Carolina—the same team that defeated Marshall before the disaster took place. That game did not occur due to the COVID-19 pandemic.

In film and television

Film
 Marshall University: Ashes to Glory, a documentary by Deborah Novak and John Witek, was released on November 18, 2000, about the crash and the subsequent recovery of the Marshall football program in the decades following.
 We Are Marshall, a film dramatizing the crash of Flight 932 and its repercussions, premiered on December 12, 2006, in Huntington. It starred Matthew McConaughey as Jack Lengyel and Matthew Fox as Red Dawson.

Television
The events of the crash are documented in an episode of Aircrash Confidential titled "Disastrous Descents".

See also

1970 Marshall Thundering Herd football team
List of accidents and incidents involving commercial aircraft
List of accidents involving sports teams
Southern Airways Flight 242 – the only other fatal Southern Airways accident
Humboldt Broncos bus crash
Wichita State University football team plane crash

References

External links
 
 Aviation history synopsis of Southern Airways Flight 932 (with photographs)
 List of victims of Southern Airways Flight 932
 Memorial page at Marshall University 
 NTSB crash report (Alternate)
 Various newspaper clippings (Archive)
 PlaneCrashInfo.Com – Southern Airways Flight 932 entry

Aviation accidents and incidents in the United States in 1970
1970 in West Virginia
Southern Airways accidents and incidents
Airliner accidents and incidents in West Virginia
Marshall Thundering Herd football
Airliner accidents and incidents involving controlled flight into terrain
Wayne County, West Virginia
Accidents and incidents involving the McDonnell Douglas DC-9
November 1970 events in the United States
Aviation accidents and incidents involving sports teams